Lindsey Bareham is a British food writer. She began her career by editing the restaurant section of Time Out magazine. For eight years, she wrote a daily recipe for the Evening Standard, and she currently writes for The Times.

Publications 
Bareham is the author of fifteen cookery books.

 In Praise of the Potato
 A Celebration of Soup
 Onions without Tears
 The Little Book of Big Soups
 The Big Red Book of Tomatoes
 Supper Won’t Take Long
 A Wolf in the Kitchen
 Just One Pot
 Dinner in a Dash
 Hungry?
 The Fish Store
 Pasties
 ' One Pot Wonders
 ' The Trifle Bowl and Other Tales
 ' Dinner Tonight

With Simon Hopkinson
 The Prawn Cocktail Years (1997)
 Roast Chicken and Other Stories

References

Living people
English food writers
Women food writers
Year of birth missing (living people)